Ghanim Oraibi Jassim Al-Roubai (born 16 August 1961) is an Iraqi football defender who played for Iraq in the 1986 FIFA World Cup. He also played for Al-Shabab.

Career 
Oraibi played as left-back, from 1979 ti 1982 fir Al-Amana, for seven years by Al-Shabab and for his 2nd time with Al-Amana.

International 
He played in all of Iraq’s 1986 World Cup games in Mexico. In 1977 at the age of 16, he joined the Amana youth team playing alongside Basil Gorgis, Natiq Hashim and Karim Allawi.

Ghanim was first called up by coach Vojo Gardesevic for the 1982 World Cup qualifiers, but was given his first start by Jorge Vieira in the 3-2 win over UAE in 1985.

Personal life  
Oraibi's son Zulfikar died in a car bomb attack in Karrada, Baghdad on 3 July 2016.

References

1961 births
Sportspeople from Baghdad
Iraqi footballers
Iraq international footballers
Association football defenders
1986 FIFA World Cup players
Living people
Olympic footballers of Iraq
Footballers at the 1988 Summer Olympics